Pseudangulatus comatus is a species of beetle in the family Cerambycidae, and the only species in the genus Pseudangulatus. It was described by Dillon and Dillon in 1959.

References

Lamiini
Beetles described in 1959